Sela pri Zburah is a small settlement in the historical region of Lower Carniola in southeastern Slovenia. It belongs to the Municipality of Šmarješke Toplice. The municipality is now included in the Southeast Slovenia Statistical Region.

Name
The name of the settlement was changed from Sela to Sela pri Zburah in 1953.

References

External links
Sela pri Zburah at Geopedia

Populated places in the Municipality of Šmarješke Toplice